Sir George FitzGerald Hill, 2nd Baronet (1 June 1763 – 8 March 1839) was an Irish politician.

Family and early life 
He was the oldest son of Sir Hugh Hill, 1st Baronet of Brook Hall, County Londonderry,
who had been a member of the Parliament of Ireland for Londonderry City from 1768 to 1795.
His mother Hannah was a daughter of John McClintock,

Hill was  educated in Londonderry and at Trinity College, Dublin. He then studied at Lincoln's Inn and was called to the bar in Ireland in 1786. In 1788, he married Jane Beresford, daughter of Hon. John Beresford (son of the Marcus Beresford, 1st Earl of Tyrone), who was President of the Irish Board of Revenue).

Career 
Hill was a member of the Orange Order, serving for time on the committee of the Grand Lodge of Ireland.

He was a member of the Parliament of Ireland for Coleraine from  1791 to 1795, and then succeeded his father as MP for Londonderry City 1798.

In the Parliament of the United Kingdom, he was the Member of Parliament (MP) for County Londonderry  from 1801 to 1802, and for Londonderry City from 1802 to 1830.

He became a member of the Privy Council of Ireland in 1808, and of the Privy Council of the United Kingdom in 1817.

He was Governor of Saint Vincent from 1830 to 1833, and then Governor of Trinidad from 1833 until his death in 1839.

References

External links 
 

1763 births
1839 deaths
People from County Londonderry
Baronets in the Baronetage of Ireland
Irish barristers
Alumni of Trinity College Dublin
Irish MPs 1790–1797
Members of the Parliament of Ireland (pre-1801) for County Londonderry constituencies
UK MPs 1801–1802
UK MPs 1802–1806
UK MPs 1806–1807
UK MPs 1807–1812
UK MPs 1812–1818
UK MPs 1818–1820
UK MPs 1820–1826
UK MPs 1826–1830
Stewart, Charles, Lord
Members of the Privy Council of Ireland
Members of the Privy Council of the United Kingdom
Governors of British Trinidad
Commissioners of the Treasury for Ireland
Governors of British Saint Vincent and the Grenadines